National Cycle Network (NCN) Route 656 is a Sustrans regional route in North Yorkshire. A  cycle way between Coxwold and a junction with NCN Route 65 near Osmotherley via Sutton Bank National Park Centre and Hawnby. The route is fully opened and signed, it is on-road using quiet country lanes. Sustrans describe it as “a very strenuous route.”

Prior to 2009 the route had been signed as part of NCN 65. Up until then it had been described as the High Level route on the Hull to Middlesbrough White Rose cycle route.

Route 
The southern end of Route 656 is in Coxwold  at a Junction with Route 65. Near the village of Kilburn the route climbs steeply up Sutton Bank. It then follows the line of an old Drovers' road before descending steeply into Hawnby. There are further climbs from there to the northern end at a junction with 65 .

History 

The route was established in 1998 as part of the White Rose cycle route. It was signed as a branch of Route 65.  The White Roses cycle route is no longer promoted and the signs have been updated by the addition of route 656 stickers.

Related NCN Routes 

Route 65 
Route 657

References

External links

 Route 656 on the Sustrans website.

Cycleways in England